LP3 or lp3 may stand for:
 Lista Przebojów Programu Trzeciego, the longest-running Polish hit songs chart
 American Football (2019 album), The third album by the band American Football, also known as American Football (LP3)
 LP3 (Ratatat album), an album by Ratatat
 LP3 (Lady Pank album), an album by Lady Pank
 Lost Planet 3, a video game
 LP3 (Hippo Campus album), an album by Hippo Campus